Reston is an unincorporated community recognized as a local urban district in southwestern Manitoba, located near the border of Saskatchewan on the west and North Dakota on the south. It is the largest community in the Rural Municipality of Pipestone, which also includes Sinclair, Cromer and Pipestone.

History
The name of the community was derived from the area where many of the original settlers came from, which was Reston Junction in Berwickshire, Scotland. The post office opened in 1890 on land location 9-7-27W. It was also a Canadian Pacific railway point and there was a school district which had the name Lanark and a district named Reston was later located on 9-7-27W.

In October 2012, Reston sold lots in the community for $10 in order to attract families and businesses.

Demographics 

Arts and culture 
Reston was featured during season 3 of the CBC program Still Standing. The episode originally aired on August 8, 2017.

References

 Geographical Names of Manitoba - Reston (page 227) - the Millennium Bureau of Canada

Designated places in Manitoba
Local urban districts in Manitoba
Unincorporated communities in Westman Region